Cabécar may refer to:

 Cabécar people, an indigenous people of Costa Rica
 Cabécar language, the language of the Cabécar people
 Talamanca Cabecar, an indigenous territory of the Cabécar in Costa Rica